Gehrden is a town in the district of Hanover, in Lower Saxony, Germany.

Notable people 

 Werner von Siemens (1816-1892), inventor, founder of electrical engineering and industrialist
 Carl Wilhelm Siemens (1823-1883), industrialist
 Werner Lueg (1931-2014), athlete, Olympic champion 1952
 Hans-Joachim Frey (born 1965), theater director
 Maria Schrader (born 1965), actress and director
 Tim Pritlove (born 1967), eventmanager, media artist and member of Chaos Computer Club
 Wolfgang Kreißig (born 1970), high jumper
 Grischa Niermann (born 1975), racing cyclist
 Marc Bator (born 1972), newsreader at the Tagesschau 2000–2013, since then at Sat.1
 Christian Pampel (born 1979), volleyball national player
 Carolina Bartczak (born 1980), actress
 Nils Pfingsten-Reddig (born 1982), soccer player
 Kristin Demann (born 1993), soccer player

References 

Towns in Lower Saxony
Hanover Region